Azerbaijan State News Agency (AZERTAC; , shortened as AZƏRTAC) is the official news agency of the Republic of Azerbaijan. From November 2022 Vugar Aliyev chairman of the board.

Along with the official state news, Azerbaijan State News Agency releases information on politics, economy, education, science, culture, health, sports and environment in eight languages such as Azerbaijani, Russian, English, French, German, Spanish, Arabic and Chinese.

History
AZERTAC was established on 1 March 1920. Throughout the Soviet period, the agency held various names and after restoration of Azerbaijani independence in 1991, the agency name was restored. From 1995 to 2000, the agency was named State Telegraph Agency under Cabinet of Ministers, then was renamed to Azerbaijan State Telegraph Agency. On 26 February 2015 President Ilham Aliyev signed an order to rename Azerbaijan State Telegraph Agency to the Azerbaijan State Information Agency (AZERTAC).

International history 
AZERTAC became a member of the Organization of Asia-Pacific News Agencies (OANA) in 2004. Agency is considered one of the founders of the Association of National Information Agencies of the countries participating in the Commonwealth of Independent States, the Association of News Agencies of Turkish-speaking countries and the Association of National News Agencies of the countries participating in the Black Sea Economic Cooperation Organization. Since 2008, AZERTAC is a member of the Asian consortium of news agencies, Asia Pulse.

During the years of 2010–2013 the agency chaired in Black Sea Economic Cooperation Organization.

At the 15th General Assembly of the OANA, held in Moscow in September 2013 AZERTAC was elected vice-president of the organization. At the same meeting in a secret ballot between member agencies Azerbaijan State News Agency received the right to chair the OANA in 2016–2019.

On 20 November 2013 at the 4th World Congress of News Agencies (NAWC), held in the capital city of Saudi Arabia, Riyadh by participation of more than seventy media structures of the world, leaders of news alliances OANA, EANA, FANA, IINA, media structures such as Sky News Arabia, Los Angeles Times, Guardian, BBC and Internet corporations like MSN, Google, Yahoo AZERTAC was elected chairman for 2016–2019. At the same time, it was decided to hold the 5th World Congress of News Agencies in Azerbaijan. At one of the Baku meetings the posts of the chairman and deputy chairman of the News Agencies of World Council were established for the first time.

On 16–17 November 2016 the 5th World Congress of News Agencies was held in Baku with the organizational support of the Heydar Aliyev Foundation and AZERTAC. Ilham Aliyev participated in the joint opening ceremony of the 5th Congress and the 16th General Assembly of OANA. The slogan of the Baku Congress was "New Challenges for News Agencies". During the framework of the congress discussions were held on the topics "The Future of Information Consumption", "Innovations of News Agencies", "News Agencies – Challenges and Opportunities of New Technologies and Social Media", "Training Journalists for the Future of Multimedia" and "Protecting the Mission of Journalists: freedom, accessibility, security and conflict areas".

International cooperation
AZERTAC cooperates with other notable news agencies such as ITAR-TASS (Russia), Anadolu Agency (Turkey), Xinhua (China), Rompres (Romania), Ukrinform (Ukraine), BelTA (Belarus), Tanjug (Serbia), BTA (Bulgaria), ANSA (Italy), IRNA (Iran), Moldpres (Moldova), ATA (Albania), MTI (Hungary) MENA (Egypt), PETRA (Jordan) and ANTARA (Indonesia), Montsame (Mongolia), Yonhap (South Korea), LETA (Latvia), Kabar (Kyrgyzstan), Kazinform (Kazakhstan), KUNA (Kuwait), and Khovar (Tajikistan), KYODO (Japan), BuaNews (South Africa), AGI (Italy), QNA(Qatar), Elta (Lithuania), Telam (Argentina) and PAP (Poland).

It is a member of Organization of Asia-Pacific News Agencies and European Alliance of News Agencies. AZERTAC is also the co-founder of Association of the National News Agencies of the Commonwealth of Independent States (CIS), Union of the Turkish Speaking News Agencies (TKA) and the Black Sea Association of National News Agencies (BSANNA). The agency has offices in the USA, UK, France, Germany, Austria, Baltic states, Hungary, Russia, Ukraine, Egypt, Turkey, Georgia, Iran, Uzbekistan, Turkmenistan, China, Japan, Spain, Romania, Italy, Sweden and all provinces of Azerbaijan.

On 16–18 November 2016 Baku hosted the 5th News Agencies World Congress, the 16th General Assembly of the Organization of Asia-Pacific News Agencies (OANA) and the 22nd session of the Council of CIS Heads of News Agencies which were co-organized by the Heydar Aliyev Foundation and AZERTAC. Almost 200 journalists from 80 countries representing more than 130 leading news agencies of the world from five continents discussed topical problems of media at the 5th News Agencies World Congress in Baku.
AZERTAC assumed presidency of the News Agencies World Congress and presidency of OANA for the next three years (2016–2019) at these events.
On 17 November, AZERTAC signed a Framework Cooperation Agreement with Spanish International News Agency (EFE), an Agreement on Cooperation with Paraguayan IP news agency of Paraguay's Secretariat of Information and Communication (SICOM) and a Memorandum of Understanding (MoU) with Bahrain's News Agency (BNA) on the sidelines of the 5th News Agencies World Congress.

Projects 
Along with the photo and information AZERTAC prepares video news about the social, political, economic and sports life of the country and releases them on its internet source and social networks. The multimedia and video news services of the agency implements several projects, such as "Cities of the World", "Travelling around Azerbaijan", "Our Monuments", "Our Leading Figures", "Persona" and "We are also like everyone".

Since 2013, "Children’s Knowledge Portal" has been functioning on the base of the AZERTAC.

References

Further reading
 State News Agency of Azerbaijan establishes video service and moves to new building, 23 April 2010.

External links
 
 
 Video service

1920 establishments in Azerbaijan
Government agencies established in 1920
News agencies based in Azerbaijan